OnniBus.com is a Finnish express coach operator. It commenced operating in 2011.

History

In 2011, OnniBus was founded by Pekka Möttö, Lauri Helke, Petteri Rantala and Pertti Möttö.

In May 2014, Brian Souter's Highland Global Transport purchased a 75% shareholding in the business. Highland Global Transport, Lauri Helke and Petteri Rantala sold their shares to Koiviston Auto in October 2018.

Advertised fares start at €1 (plus €1 booking fee), using a yield management model as employed by Megabus.

Services
As of November 2017, OnniBus.com operated services on 17 routes:

F1: Helsinki – Turku – Naantali
F2: Helsinki – Pori – Vaasa
F3: Helsinki – Tampere – Seinäjoki – Vaasa
F3C: Helsinki – Tampere
F4: Helsinki – Lahti - Jyväskylä – Oulu/Rovaniemi
F4-SKI: Helsinki – Jyväskylä – Oulu – Ylläs – Levi
F5: Helsinki – Mikkeli – Kuopio
F5-SKI: Helsinki – Mikkeli – Kuopio – Kuusamo – Ruka
F6: Helsinki – Kouvola - Lappeenranta – Imatra - Joensuu
F7: Helsinki – Kotka
F8: Helsinki – Turku – Pori – Vaasa – Kokkola – Oulu
F9: Turku – Tampere – Jyväskylä – Kuopio – Kajaani
F11: Tampere – Pori
F12: Tampere - Lahti – Kouvola – Lappeenranta
F13: Helsinki – Jyväskylä – Kokkola
F14: Helsinki – Lahti – Mikkeli – Savonlinna
F18: Jyväskylä – Seinäjoki
F23: Helsinki – Lahti – Mikkeli – Joensuu

Aside from the cities mentioned above, OnniBus.com's buses stop at numerous other places but unlike Matkahuolto's intercity buses, they do not stop at all express stops on the way. Passengers can board and leave the bus only at predetermined stops, often located at city and town centres or highway junctions. This practice cuts travel times whilst also making business more profitable according to the company.

Fleet
OnniBus operates a fleet of 48 Van Hool Astromega TDX27s as of October 2015. In March 2016 Onnibus imported used Van Hool Altano TD921s from its sister company, PolskiBus.

References

External links

Company website

Bus companies of Finland
2011 establishments in Finland